Stephan's Quintet is a visual grouping of five galaxies of which four form the first compact galaxy group ever discovered. The group, visible in the constellation Pegasus, was discovered by Édouard Stephan in 1877 at the Marseille Observatory.
The group is the most studied of all the compact galaxy groups. The brightest member of the visual grouping (and the only non-member of the true group) is NGC 7320, which has extensive H II regions, identified as red blobs, where active star formation is occurring.

Four of the five galaxies in Stephan's Quintet form a physical association, a true galaxy group, Hickson Compact Group 92, and will likely merge with each other. Radio observations in the early 1970s revealed a filament of emission between the galaxies in the group. This same region is also detected in the faint glow of ionized atoms seen in the visible part of the spectrum as a green arc.

Space telescopes have provided new insight into the nature of the filament, which is now believed to be a shock-wave in the intergalactic gas, caused by one galaxy (NGC 7318B) falling into the center of the group at several millions of kilometres per hour.

Stephan's Quintet was selected as one of the five cosmic objects observed by the James Webb Space Telescope as part of the release of its first official science images.

Emissions

X-rays 

As NGC 7318B collides with gas in the group, a huge shock wave bigger than the Milky Way spreads throughout the medium between the galaxies, heating some of the gas to temperatures of millions of degrees where they emit X-rays detectable with the NASA Chandra X-ray Observatory.

Molecular hydrogen emission

The NASA Spitzer Space Telescope, which detects infrared radiation, discovered a very powerful molecular hydrogen signal from the shock wave between the galaxies. This emission is one of the most turbulent formations of molecular hydrogen ever seen, and the strongest emission originates near the center of the green area in the visible light picture discussed earlier. This phenomenon was discovered by an international team led by scientists at the California Institute of Technology and including scientists from Australia, Germany and China. The detection of molecular hydrogen from the collision was initially unexpected because the hydrogen molecule is very fragile and is easily destroyed in shock waves of the kind expected in Stephan's Quintet. However, one solution is that when a shock front moves through a cloudy medium like the center of the group, millions of smaller shocks are produced in a turbulent layer, and this can allow molecular hydrogen to survive.

Redshift

NGC 7320 indicates a small redshift (790 km/s) while the other four exhibit large redshifts (near 6,600 km/s). Since galactic redshift is proportional to distance, NGC 7320 is only a foreground projection and is ~39 million light-years from Earth, making it a possible member of the NGC 7331 group, versus the 210–340 million light-years of the other four.

NGC 7319 has a type 2 Seyfert nucleus.

A sixth galaxy, NGC 7320C, probably belongs to the Hickson association: it has a redshift similar to the Hickson galaxies, and a tidal tail appears to connect it with NGC 7319.

Infrared
Using its Mid Infrared Instrument (MIRI), the James Webb Space Telescope shows details shrouded by dust in visible light including large shock waves and tidal tails in four of the five galaxies, and previously hidden areas of star formation. These new details will contribute to insights on galaxy evolution.

Members

In popular culture 
The angelic figures at the beginning of the 1946 holiday film It's a Wonderful Life are based on images of Stephan's Quintet.

Gallery

See also 
 Wild's Triplet
 Zwicky's Triplet
 NGC 7331 Group (Deer Lick Group, about half a degree northeast of Stephan's Quintet)
 Robert's Quartet
 Seyfert's Sextet
 Copeland Septet

References

External links

 GALEX: Stephan's Quintet and NGC 7331
 Star Clusters Born in the Wreckage of Cosmic Collisions
 News Release at ESA/Hubble
 Stephan's Quintet
 NightSkyInfo.com : Stephan's Quintet
 What's Behind Stephan's Quintet? Peter Edmonds, Chandra Blog, 21 July 2009
 Astronomy Picture of the Day on Stephan's Quintet: 13 Nov 2000   12 Aug 2003   11 Sep 2009
 NASA’s James Webb Space Telescope reveals never-before-seen details of the galaxy group called “Stephan’s Quintet.”
 

 
92
Pegasus (constellation)
Astronomical objects discovered in 1877